Clerke may refer to:

People
 Agnes Mary Clerke (1842–1907), Irish astronomer and science writer
 Charles Clerke (1741–1779), British naval officer and explorer
 Charles Clerke (footballer) (1857–1944), English footballer
 Ellen Mary Clerke (1840–1906), Irish poet, linguist and journalist
 Francis Clerke (disambiguation)
 John Clerke (disambiguation)
 Clerke baronets, three baronetcies
 Sir Clement Clerke, 1st Baronet (died 1693), English entrepreneur
 Sir William Clerke, 8th Baronet (1751–1818), English clergyman

Other
 .38/.45 Clerke, a wildcat semi-automatic pistol cartridge 
 Clerke (crater), a lunar crater named after Agnes Mary Clerke
 Clerke Rocks, a group of small rocky islands in the South Atlantic, named after Charles Clerke
 Clerke v. Harwood (1797), a United States Supreme Court case concerning debts owed to British subjects

See also
Clark (disambiguation)
Clarke (disambiguation)
Clerk (disambiguation)